Nalchik (Kabardian:  //;  //) is the capital city of Kabardino-Balkaria, Russia, situated at an altitude of  in the foothills of the Caucasus Mountains; about  northwest of Beslan (Beslan is in the Republic of North Ossetia–Alania). Population:

History
The territory of modern-day Nalchik was formerly known as Slabada. It was inhabited by native Kabardians, Balkars, Chechens, Adeki, and Cherkese, until around 1743; groups occasionally clashed over and dispute their claims to the land. The modern city dates from the early 19th century when the expanding Russian Empire built a fort there together with settling Mountain Jews in 1818; this date is seen at the top of the city's coat of arms. With the founding of the city of Nalchik, the disputes among the native groups calmed and life improved for the people in the region.

In 1838, a Russian military settlement was founded in the city, and after the Russian Revolution of 1917, in the year 1921, Nalchik was given the status of administrative center of Kabardin Autonomous Oblast. During the Russian Empire, the settlement was the administrative capital of the Nalchiksky Okrug of the Terek Oblast.

The word "Nalchik" literally means "small horseshoe" in Kabardian (or Circassian, a Northwest Caucasian language) and Karachay-Balkar (a Turkic language). It is a diminutive of na'l, a common Middle Eastern word (Arabic, Persian, Turkish) for "horseshoe", possibly from the ancient Scythian, 'nalak" (horseshoe). The city of Nalchik was named this way because of how it is shaped as surrounded by the mountains of the land, and the Nalchik River is named after the city it runs across.

During World War II, on 2 November 1942, Nalchik was occupied by Romanian mountain troops (Vânători de munte) under the command of Brigadier General Ioan Dumitrache, its capture earning the Romanian General the Knight's Cross of the Iron Cross. The city was heavily damaged during the conflict. General Dumitrache went to great length ordering his troops to protect local population during the time Nalchik was occupied by Romanian forces. Professor A. N. Dainaco, the Mayor of Nalchik at that time, thanked General Dumitrache for liberating the city. Although he was accused of war crimes, General Dumitrache was fully exonerated after the war by a joint Soviet and Romanian judicial commission.

Due to the harsh treatment of Jewish People by the Soviet Union, there has been a mass exodus of Jews from Nalchik over the decades, reducing the population that is left to a small percentage of what once was.

The historic River Nalchik was at its strongest until the 1950s, until the outflow from the mountains began to decrease.

In 1990, there was a 6.0 magnitude earthquake in Nalchik.

Nalchik was chosen the "second cleanest city of Russia" in 2003.

On October 13, 2005, Nalchik was attacked by a large group of Yarmuk Jamaat militants led by Shamil Basayev and Anzor Astemirov. Buildings associated with the Russian security forces were targeted, killing at least 14 civilians and wounding 115. Thirty-five policemen were killed in the fighting and eighty-nine militants, including prominent leader Ilias Gorchkhanov, were killed while another fifty-nine were arrested.

Administrative and municipal status
Within the framework of administrative divisions, it is, together with four rural localities, incorporated as the city of republic significance of Nalchik—an administrative unit with the status equal to that of the districts. As a municipal division, the city of republic significance of Nalchik is incorporated as Nalchik Urban Okrug.

Ethnic groups

The population of the city in 2006 included the following breakdown by ethnicity:
Kabardians (Adiga) (42.3%)
Russians (28.3%)
Balkars (Taulu) (15.2%)
others (13.2%)

2002 census data is as follows:
Kabardians (47.3%)
Russians (31.8%)
Balkars (11.4%)
Ossetians (1.9%)
Ukrainians (1.0%)

Economy and education
Nalchik is a balneological and mountain climatotherapy resort, with several sanatoriums. It also serves as an industrial center of the republic (non-ferrous metallurgy, light industry, construction materials manufacturing, machine building).

Nalchik is home to the following facilities of higher education:
Kabardino-Balkarian State University
North Caucasian State Institute of Arts
Kabardino-Balkarian State Agricultural Academy

Climate
Nalchik has a hot-summer humid continental climate (Köppen climate classification: Dfa) with hot summers and no dry season. The warm season lasts from late May to mid-September and the cold season from December to March. Most forms of precipitation are light rain and thunderstorms, as well as light snow and moderate snow. Wind speeds are typically calm to a light breeze through the year.

Sports
PFC Spartak Nalchik is an association football club based in Nalchik, playing in the Russian Premier League. The 2008 World Women's Chess Championship has also been held in Nalchik on August 28–September 18, 2008.

Notable people
Khadzhimurat Akkayev, Olympic weightlifter, born 1985
Astemir Apanasov, Circassian singer, musician, composer, and actor
Viktor Belenko, Soviet pilot who defected with a MiG-25, landing in Hakodate, Japan
Dima Bilan, singer, born 1981
Felix Frankl, Austrian and Soviet mathematician, physicist and aerodynamics (1905–1961)
Andre Geim, Soviet, British and Netherlands physicist; Nobel laureate
Muhadin Kishev, Soviet and Spanish artist, born 1938
Andrei Kolkoutine painter, born 1957
Azamat Kuliev, painter, born 1963
Eldar Kuliev, film director, screenwriter, born 1951
Alim Kouliev, actor, theater director, born 1959
Katya Lel, singer, born in 1974
Alexander Litvinenko, ex-FSB officer turned anti-Putin activist, born 1962, poisoned with polonium-210 and died 2006.
Leo Mol, Soviet and Canadian artist and sculptor (1915–2009)
Nikolay Pavlov, professional footballer, born 1987
Yuri Temirkanov, orchestra conductor, born 1938
Mikhail Zalikhanov, academician of Russian Academy of Sciences, born 1939

Twin towns and sister cities
 Amman, Jordan
 Kayseri, Turkey
 Vladikavkaz, Russia
 Reno, Nevada, United States

References

Notes

Sources

External links

Nalcik. Official Website of Kabardino-Balkaria 

Cities and towns in Kabardino-Balkaria
Terek Oblast
Spa towns in Russia
Populated places established in 1818
Holocaust locations in Russia
1818 establishments in the Russian Empire